Fabian Herbers (born 17 August 1993) is a German professional footballer who plays as a forward for Major League Soccer club Chicago Fire.

Club career

Early career
Prior to playing in the United States, Herbers competed for both FC Twente, SC Preußen Münster and VfL Rhede at youth level. He then went to play three years of college soccer in the United States at Creighton University between 2013 and 2015 before signing a Generation Adidas contract with Major League Soccer.

Philadelphia Union
Herbers was selected sixth overall in the 2016 MLS SuperDraft by Philadelphia Union. He made his Union debut on 6 March 2016, as an 83rd-minute substitute during a 2–0 loss against FC Dallas. He began his career playing between the Union and Bethlehem Steel FC, making a total of six Steel appearances and scoring two goals in 2016, including the franchise’s first-ever goal in a 1–0 win on 25 March in their first match against FC Montreal. He scored his first goal for the Union during a 3–2 win vs. Columbus Crew SC on 1 June 2016 in the 83rd minute after being subbed on 8 minutes prior. In 2016, he totaled 32 league appearances, scoring three goals and leading all league rookies with seven helpers. He also scored one goal and one assist in two U.S. Open Cup appearances.

2017 was a frustrating year for Herbers as he totalled only 15 appearances. He scored his first goal of the season during a substitute appearance in a 4–0 win at D.C. United. Herbers suffered a groin injury vs. Colorado Rapids on 20 May 2017 and missed a month before returning to practice and suffering a sports hernia, ending his 2017 season.

Chicago Fire
On 9 December 2018, Herbers was traded to Chicago Fire in exchange for a second-round pick in the 2019 MLS SuperDraft.

Personal life
Herbers earned his U.S. green card in July 2017.

Career statistics

References

External links 
 Creighton Profile
 

1993 births
Living people
People from Ahaus
Sportspeople from Münster (region)
All-American men's college soccer players
German footballers
Association football forwards
Major League Soccer players
USL Championship players
SuS Stadtlohn players
Creighton Bluejays men's soccer players
Philadelphia Union draft picks
Philadelphia Union players
Philadelphia Union II players
Chicago Fire FC players
German expatriate footballers
Expatriate soccer players in the United States
German expatriate sportspeople in the United States
Footballers from North Rhine-Westphalia